Ten Preludes, Op. 23, is a set of ten preludes for solo piano, composed by Sergei Rachmaninoff in 1901 and 1903. This set includes the famous Prelude in G minor.

Together with the Prelude in C minor, Op. 3/2 and the 13 Preludes, Op. 32, this set is part of a full suite of 24 preludes in all the major and minor keys.

Composition 
Op. 23 is composed of ten preludes, ranging from two to five minutes in length. Combined, the pieces take around thirty minutes to perform. They are:

 No. 1 in F minor (Largo)
 No. 2 in B major (Maestoso)
 No. 3 in D minor (Tempo di minuetto)
 No. 4 in D major (Andante cantabile)
 No. 5 in G minor (Alla marcia)
 No. 6 in E major (Andante)
 No. 7 in C minor (Allegro)
 No. 8 in A major (Allegro vivace)
 No. 9 in E minor (Presto)
 No. 10 in G major (Largo)

Rachmaninoff completed Prelude No. 5 in 1901. The remaining preludes were completed after Rachmaninoff's marriage to his cousin Natalia Satina: Nos. 1, 4, and 10 premiered in Moscow on February 10, 1903, and the remaining seven were completed soon thereafter. The years 1900–1903 were difficult for Rachmaninoff and his motivation for writing the Preludes was predominantly financial. Rachmaninoff composed the works in the Hotel America, financially dependent on his cousin Alexander Siloti, to whom the Preludes are dedicated.

Analysis 

Rachmaninoff's Ten Preludes abandon the traditional short prelude form delineated by composers such as Bach, Scriabin, and Chopin. Unlike Chopin's set, some half-page musical fragments, Rachmaninoff's Ten Preludes last for several minutes each, expanding into complex polyphonic forms with musically independent sections. The pieces perhaps represent a culmination of the Romantic idiom. The set reflects Rachmaninoff's experience as a virtuoso pianist and master composer, testing the "...technical, tonal, harmonic, rhythmic, lyrical, and percussive capabilities of the piano."

The popular Prelude in C minor, Op. 3, No. 2 perhaps unfairly eclipses the Op. 23 Preludes. Rachmaninoff remarked, "...I think the Preludes of Op. 23 are far better music than my first Prelude, but the public has shown no disposition to share in my belief...." The composer never played all of the Preludes in one sitting, preferring to cycle through a rotating mix of his favorites.

From a performance standpoint, the ten Op. 23 Preludes exhibit wide variations in difficulty. Nos. 1, 4, 5, and 10 are conceivably in reach of the "advanced-intermediate" pianist, while the endurance and dexterity demanded by nos. 2, 3, 6, 7, 8, and – above all – 9, require more advanced skill. Nonetheless, even the "easier" preludes present subtle interpretive challenges in counterpoint, dynamic control, and timing, putting true mastery of the pieces out of reach to all but those with virtuosic skill.

Reception 

The Ten Preludes, along with the Op. 3 prelude and the Thirteen Preludes of Op. 32, are considered to be among Rachmaninoff's best works for solo piano. The "Russian" quality of the Op. 23 preludes is often noted by listeners: after hearing Boris Asafyev play the preludes, the painter Ilya Repin noted a streak of Russian nationalism and originality in rhythm and melody. At the same recital, Vladimir Stasov praised the characteristic "Rachmaninoff sound" and unusual and innovative bell-like quality of the pieces, and Maxim Gorky simply noted, "How well he hears the silence."

Music editions 

Most editions of the Op. 23 Preludes contain significant editorial distortions in dynamics and phrasing. In 1986, Ruth Laredo set out to produce the first authentic version but was unable to obtain the original manuscripts. The Piano Quarterly praised Laredo's editorial practices, remarking that, "this seems to be the edition to own."

However, in 1992, Boosey & Hawkes published an edition edited by Robert Threlfall, who had managed to obtain access to the original manuscripts. This edition is widely regarded as the first truly authentic version.

See also
 Preludes (Rachmaninoff)

References

External links 
 
  Piano.ru – Sheet music download
  Chubrik.ru – Audio download
 
 
 

1901 compositions
1903 compositions
Preludes by Sergei Rachmaninoff